Gytis Padimanskas (born 13 May 1972) is a Lithuanian professional footballer currently playing for A Lyga club FK Sūduva. He is 191 cm tall and weighs 85 kg.

Padimanskas has been the second-choice goalkeeper for Lithuania national football team since 2005, making seven appearances for the side.

References

1972 births
Living people
Lithuanian footballers
Lithuania international footballers
FK Sūduva Marijampolė players
Association football goalkeepers